Fred Meijer White Pine Trail State Park is a  long linear state park in the U.S. state of Michigan.

The trail extends from northern Grand Rapids to Cadillac, and it lies on the path graded for the Grand Rapids and Indiana Railroad (later absorbed by the Pennsylvania Railroad). The White Pine Trail is a rail trail park. It was named the "Fred Meijer White Pine Trail State Park" after a donation by grocery store executive Fred Meijer.

History 
As the railroad ceased operation in the mid-1980s, the Michigan Department of Transportation came to own the rail bed. By 1994 the property was transferred to the Michigan Department of Natural Resources (DNR), which began replacing the rails with a trail for public recreational use.

Current Condition 
The trail extends from Ann Street in Grand Rapids north to Cadillac. The trail has only one unpaved section: one extending  between Howard City and Big Rapids. This unpaved section of the trail is surfaced with packed gravel or cinders.

Snowmobiles are permitted on most of the trail, between Russell Road (near Cedar Springs) and South Street in Cadillac.  Motorized wheel vehicles (other than personal accessibility devices) are not permitted.

In addition to the Michigan DNR doing maintenance on the trail, volunteers, organized by Friends of the White Pine Trail.  also provide hundreds of volunteer hours of maintenance and advocacy work.

Communities Along Trail 
The trail passes through the following communities:

Comstock Park, Michigan
Belmont, Michigan
Rockford, Michigan
Cedar Springs, Michigan
Sand Lake, Michigan
Pierson, Michigan
Howard City, Michigan
Morley, Michigan
Stanwood, Michigan
Big Rapids, Michigan
Paris, Michigan
Reed City, Michigan
Ashton, Michigan
Le Roy, Michigan
Tustin, Michigan
Cadillac, Michigan

Waypoints

Waypoints for the Fred Meijer White Pine Trail State Park.
↑ in the Distance column points to the other waypoint that the distance is between.

Plans
The trail is also connected to other trail systems in the state, including the Kent Trails system in Grand Rapids (currently connected with a designated bike route through the city between Butterworth Ave SW and the Lake Michigan Credit Union Ballpark,) Musketawa Trail, much as the White Pine Trail already connects with the Pere Marquette State Trail in Reed City.

References

External links 
The White Pine Trail - TheRockfordNetwork.com
Friends of the White Pine Trail
Michigan Rail Trail info
  White Pine Trail State Park page at RailsToTrails.us

Rail trails in Michigan
State parks of Michigan
Protected areas of Kent County, Michigan
Protected areas of Montcalm County, Michigan
Protected areas of Mecosta County, Michigan
Protected areas of Osceola County, Michigan
Protected areas of Wexford County, Michigan
U.S. Route 131
Bike paths in Michigan
Hiking trails in Michigan